Mundri East County is an administrative area in Western Equatoria, South Sudan.

References

Western Equatoria
Counties of South Sudan